Qeshlaq-e Qarah Kakil may refer to:
Qeshlaq-e Qarah Kakil Ayaz
Qeshlaq-e Qarah Kakil Hajji Mahmud
Qeshlaq-e Qarah Kakil Matleb